Enrique Burgos Calles (born October 7, 1965) is a Panamanian former professional baseball pitcher. He played in Major League Baseball (MLB) for the Kansas City Royals and San Francisco Giants and in the Chinese Professional Baseball League (CPBL) for the Brother Elephants and Uni-President Lions.

Career
From 1993 to 1995, he played for the Kansas City Royals and the San Francisco Giants. He was signed by the Toronto Blue Jays as an amateur free agent in 1983 and was involved in a trade for Brent Cookson in 1995. He would have stints in Mexico and Taiwan before ending his professional career.

References

Sources

1965 births
Living people
Acereros de Monclova players
Altoona Curve players
Dunedin Blue Jays players
Florence Blue Jays players
Gulf Coast Blue Jays players
Kansas City Royals players
Knoxville Blue Jays players
Kinston Blue Jays players
Major League Baseball pitchers
Major League Baseball players from Panama
Mexican League baseball pitchers
Miami Miracle players
Myrtle Beach Blue Jays players
Omaha Royals players
Panamanian expatriate baseball players in Canada
Panamanian expatriate baseball players in Mexico
Panamanian expatriate baseball players in the United States
People from La Chorrera District
Phoenix Firebirds players
Piratas de Campeche players
San Francisco Giants players
Syracuse Chiefs players
Ventura County Gulls players
Panamanian expatriate baseball players in Taiwan
Brother Elephants players
Uni-President Lions players